Several vessels of the British Royal Navy have been named Tickler:

  was a purchased brig-sloop that the French captured in 1783.
 Tickler was a gunboat purchased in the West Indies that participated in the capture of Martinique, St. Lucia, and Guadeloupe in early 1794; her fate is currently as obscure as her origins
  was a  that the Navy sold in 1802.
  was a later Archer-class gun-brig that six Danish gunboats captured in 1808.
  was the hired armed cutter Lord Duncan, launched at Dover in 1798 that served the Navy from 1798 to 1801; the Navy purchased her in 1808 and she served as HMS Tickler until 1816 when the Navy sold her.
  was a Gadfly-class flat-iron gunboat.

See also
 was a sloop purchased in Honduras for local use as a gunvessel, armed with one 18-pounder gun. She was still listed in 1800 and her ultimate disposition is unknown. Tickler was never commissioned into the Royal Navy, and her officers and crew were civilians.

Royal Navy ship names